Deniz Atiye Yılmaz (born 22 November 1988), originally known by the artist name Atiye Deniz and later by the mononym Atiye, is a Turkish pop singer. She releases songs in Turkish, Arabic and English.

Career
The second album by Atiye was self-titled and released under Sony Music label. It spawned a number of hits for the artist. The lead single "Muamma" and the second single "Salla" became huge hits in Turkey. They peaked at respectively No.5 and No.3 at the official Turkish chart.

In 2011, she became the Best Turkish Act at the MTV Europe Music Awards.

Personal life 
Atiye was born on 22 November 1988 to a Turkish father of Arab descent and Dutch mother. Her paternal family is the one of Arab families in antique multicultural city Hatay.She spent her childhood in Netherlands, the United States and Turkey. She Studied arts at the CKE in the Netherlands and moved to Turkey in 2008. Besides speaking German, Turkish and Dutch, she also speaks English and French whilst learning Spanish.

Discography

Albums 
 Gözyaşlarım 2007 Sony Music
 Atiye 2009 Sony Music
 Budur 2011 Pasaj
 Soygun Var 2013 Pasaj
 Deli İşi 2022 Mikslarj

Singles 
 "Yetmez" (2014)
 "Sor" (2015)
 "Come to Me" (2015)
 "Abrakadabra" (2015)
 "İnşallah Canım Ya" (2016)
 "Cimali Vali" (from the Bana Git De movie soundtrack) (2016)
 "Zamansız Aşklar" (2017)
 "Radiant Night" (2017)
 "We Got That La" (2017)
 "Hisset" (2018)
 "Tom Tom" (2019)
 "Ses Seda Yok" (2021)
 "Allem Kallem" (2022)

Duets 
 Kal (with Teoman)
 Güzelim (with Sultana)
 Aşkistan (with Ozan Doğulu)
 Nasıl Yani (with İskender Paydaş & Mirkelam)

Filmography 
 Bu İşte Bir Yalnızlık Var (2013)
 Bana Git De (2016) – Leyal

References

External links

 Official website

1988 births
Living people
Dutch pop singers
Turkish Arab people
21st-century Dutch singers
21st-century Dutch women singers
MTV Europe Music Award winners